Wambercourt is a commune in the Pas-de-Calais department in the Nord-Pas de Calais region of France.

Geography
Wambercourt lies along the valley of the Planquette (a tributary of the Canche), in upper Artois.

Population

See also
Communes of the Pas-de-Calais department

References

Communes of Pas-de-Calais
Artois